Beinn a' Chapuill (759 m) is a mountain in the Northwest Highlands of Scotland. It is located in Ross and Cromarty, close to the community of Glenelg.

A rugged peak, its finest feature is its long east ridge. The famous brochs of Dun Telve and Dun Troddan lie in close proximity.

References

Marilyns of Scotland
Grahams
Mountains and hills of the Northwest Highlands